Sredorek Peak is the peak rising to 1291 m in Korten Ridge east of Kasabova Glacier and west of Sabine Glacier on Davis Coast in Graham Land, Antarctica.

The peak is named after the settlements of Sredorek in eastern and western Bulgaria.

Location
German-British mapping in 1996.

Map
 Trinity Peninsula. Scale 1:250000 topographic map No. 5697. Institut für Angewandte Geodäsie and British Antarctic Survey, 1996.

Notes

References
 Bulgarian Antarctic Gazetteer. Antarctic Place-names Commission. (details in Bulgarian, basic data in English)
 Sredorek Peak. SCAR Composite Antarctic Gazetteer

External links
 Sredorek Peak. Copernix satellite image

Mountains of Graham Land
Bulgaria and the Antarctic
Davis Coast